Serge Lagauche (born 2 January 1940) is a former member of the Senate of France, who represented the Val-de-Marne department.  He is a member of the Socialist Party.

References
Page on the Senate website 

1940 births
Living people
Socialist Party (France) politicians
French Senators of the Fifth Republic
Senators of Val-de-Marne
Place of birth missing (living people)